Khrabrovo Airport , also appearing in historical documents as Powunden Airfield, is the airport of Kaliningrad, located  north of the city near the village of Khrabrovo. While it mostly serves scheduled domestic destinations, part of it is still a military base of the Russian Navy.

The base is home to the 398th Independent Air Transport Squadron of the 132nd Composite Aviation Division of the Baltic Fleet along with the Special Purpose Aviation Detachment Kaliningrad of the Russian National Guard

History
In 1922, the joint Russian–German joint venture Deruluft started flights on the first scheduled international route, from Königsberg (Devau airport) to Moscow. During World War II the airfield was taken over for military use. After the war, the airport was transferred to the Civil Air Fleet of the USSR in 1945, but military aircraft continued to be based at the airfield.

In the 1950s, Khrabrovo was a major operating location for Ilyushin Il-28 (Beagle) tactical bombers, and at least one MiG-15 (Fagot) was observed at the airfield. At this time it was known as Kaliningrad/Powunden Airfield.

By the 1960s, the airfield was regaining its use for civil air transport, and a Joint Air Squadron was formed in 1961. The use of "Kaliningrad/Powunden" by Western intelligence ceased after July 1962 and the airfield became known as "Khrabrovo". At that time, the runway was listed as having a length of 1,920 m (6,290 ft) with alert aprons and 20 hardstands, but no aircraft were observed.

In 1977, the first Tupolev Tu-134 operations began, followed by the construction of a passenger terminal in 1979. Tupolev Tu-154 service began in 1988.

In 1992, the enterprise separated from Vnukovo Production association and became an independent entity. The following year, the first scheduled international flights began. The air enterprise was renamed "Kaliningrad Avia" in 1997, but fell into receivership in 2001. The airport changed ownership the following year and became a joint stock company. In 2004, the runway, apron, and navigation facilities were rebuilt. The new air enterprise was renamed KD Avia in 2005, with the new terminal opened in 2007. In 2009, KD Avia airlines ceased operation.

FIFA-2018 re-construction
 
In July 2016, Novaport bought the Khrabrovo Airport from Aeroinvest. As part of Russia's preparations to host the 2018 FIFA World Cup, in July 2017, a new terminal was put into operation. In addition, the airport infrastructure was modernized and this included the lengthening and reinforcement of the runway, the installation of new radiotechnical, lighting, and weather forecast equipment and construction of new aircraft parking spaces and a high-speed taxiway.

The reconstruction of the passenger terminal and the runway enlargement were officially finished on 27 April 2018.

Airlines and destinations

Statistics

Annual traffic

Ground transportation
The bus line No. 244э connects the airport with the Kaliningrad Main Bus/Railway Station.

See also
List of the busiest airports in Russia
List of the busiest airports in Europe
List of the busiest airports in the former USSR

References

External links

 ASN Accidents history for UMKK
 NOAA/NWS current weather observations

Airports in Kaliningrad Oblast
Kaliningrad
Russian Air Force bases
Installations of the Russian Navy